The Philosophy Now Festival is a large philosophy festival held every two years in central London.

The Festival is hosted and organised by the newsstand magazine Philosophy Now, which aims to take philosophy to the widest possible audience. The Festival is open to the general public, at little or no cost.

The first Philosophy Now Festival was held in 2011. It was held partly to mark the 20th anniversary of the launch of Philosophy Now magazine. Since then the Philosophy Now Festival has become a regular biannual event. The second Philosophy Now Festival was held in 2013, the third in 2015, the fourth in January 2018 and the fifth in January 2020. Each festival is a one-day event involving contributions from more than a dozen philosophy organisations including Philosophy For All and the Royal Institute of Philosophy.

Venue 
The Festival is held at Conway Hall, a large art deco building in Bloomsbury in central London. The Festival uses the entire building, and there are usually three or four events running at any one time.

Against Stupidity Award 
A regular feature of the Philosophy Now Festival is the presentation of the Philosophy Now Award for Contributions in the Fight Against Stupidity. This always includes an acceptance speech, sometimes made via a video link.

Before the 2015 Philosophy Now Festival it was announced that the Award would for the first time be given to a children's author, Cressida Cowell.

References

External links
 

2011 establishments in England
Arts festivals in England
Festivals in London
Philosophy events